The Scholars is the name of an English a cappella group of four to five solo singers active 1968-2010, mainly in the field of classical music. In the United States they were also known as The Scholars of London and The Voices of London.

Membership
Each of the five original members of The Scholars had been a Choral scholar in the Choir of King's College, Cambridge under David Willcocks between 1964 and 1968, and David Van Asch, the founder, organiser and bass of the group, had also been a boy chorister there under Boris Ord. After beginning as a male voice quintet (AATBarB), they had a middle phase (1972–82) as a mixed voice quintet (SATBarB) and latterly worked as an SATB quartet. Membership of The Scholars was nevertheless remarkably stable over its 40-year existence. The original members (1968) were Nigel Perrin (countertenor I), Timothy Brown (countertenor II), Robin Doveton (tenor), Stephen Varcoe (baritone) and David Van Asch (bass). After approximately three years Perrin, Brown and Varcoe left and were replaced, respectively, by Shelagh Molyneux (soprano), Nigel Dixon and Michael Leighton Jones. The latter was replaced in 1980 by Philip O'Reilly, and when he left in 1982 the group continued as an SATB quartet. In 1982 Paula Bott became The Scholars' soprano, followed by Kym Amps in 1988. In 1987 Angus Davidson replaced Dixon as countertenor and in 2004 Simon Grant took over from Van Asch as bass.

Whilst The Scholars no longer exists as such, ex-members remain active in other related musical fields, e.g. solo and ensemble singing, conducting, teaching and composing.

Concerts
The Scholars' first public concert took place in Chelsea Town Hall in 1969 and they were subsequently signed by London agent Ibbs and Tillett who obtained numerous concerts for them all around the United Kingdom. A promotional European tour in 1972 sparked three decades of concert tours in over fifty countries. The Scholars sang in many of the world's premier concert venues: The Queen Elizabeth Hall, Purcell Room and St John's, Smith Square, London; The Opera Houses of Sydney and Buenos Aires; Alice Tully Hall, New York; Symphony Hall, Osaka; Auditorio Nacional, Madrid; Brahmsaal, Musikverein, Vienna to name but a few. On a number of occasions the British Council selected The Scholars to represent British musical culture, promoting tours in Iran, Kenya, Ghana, Cameroon, Malaysia, Indonesia and Thailand.

Performance style
At the outset, being a male voice ensemble, The Scholars' ideals remained close to those cultivated by David Willcocks at King's College, Cambridge: accurate tuning, rhythmic precision, clarity of diction and neat coordination of consonants. With the addition of a soprano voice came the opportunity for a warmer, more soloistic style of singing. In the 1990s the requirements of Early Music prompted an adjustment of tuning ideals away from equal temperament towards just intonation. The Scholars possessed an outgoing stage presence and their spoken introductions, as well as being informative, were often of a humorous nature.

Repertoire  and programming
The promotion of English music and of the English singing tradition, were high on The Scholars' original priorities. Early programmes included English madrigals and sacred music of the 16th and early 17th centuries (Byrd, Tallis, Morley etc.). The lighter side of their repertoire with which they often concluded their concerts - spirituals and close harmony arrangements - initially continued to echo student days. Sets of five-voice folksong arrangements were made for The Scholars by David Willcocks (Five Folksongs), Gordon Langford (5 Sea Shanties) and John Rutter (5 Traditional Songs) which soon superseded the close harmony arrangements. From 1982, when The Scholars reduced to SATB, their place was in turn taken by Robin Doveton's four-voice folksong arrangements, although songs by The Beatles were still sung as encores. During the 1980s Italian, French, German and Spanish music of the Renaissance became standard repertoire and English glees of the late 18th and early 19th centuries were revived, including works by Arnold, Webbe and Callcott.

Contemporary music often formed part of The Scholars' programmes and included specially composed works by Philip Radcliffe (Cor Cordium), Malcolm Williamson (Death of Cuchulan), William Wordsworth (Adonais), John Rutter (It was a Lover and his Lass), John Joubert (Five Carols), William Mathias (Ceremony After A Fire Raid), Robert Walker (The Sun on the Celandines), Christopher Brown (Herrick Songs and From the Doorways of the Dawn) and Howard Blake (The New National Songbook and 'Lullaby - A Christmas Narrative' which includes the original version of Walking in the Air). The group forged strong connections with Spain and often sung works composed for them by Ángel Barja of León.

Non-specialist programmes were generally structured to include six groups of songs (three in each half of the concert), each themed by musical genre or subject matter, aiming for contrast of pace, humour/seriousness and key. Specialist programmes also became more and more in demand for Early Music festivals, and complete Mass settings by Josquin and Byrd often formed the basis of these.

The Scholars Baroque Ensemble
In 1992 Van Asch brought together, as artistic director, a small group of specialist baroque instrumentalists and extra singers to collaborate, without a conductor, with The Scholars in performances and recordings of major works by Handel (Messiah, Acis and Galatea, Dixit Dominus), Bach (Johannes Passion, Motets), Purcell (The Fairy Queen, The Indian Queen) and Monteverdi (Vespers).

Discography

External links
Doveton Music - source for Robin Doveton's folksong arrangements and musical editions, many of which were created for The Scholars
http://www.naxos.com/person/Scholars_of_London/15256.htm
http://www.naxos.com/person/Scholars_Baroque_Ensemble_34077/34077.htm
http://www.bach-cantatas.com/Bio/Scholars-Baroque-Ensemble.htm

A cappella musical groups
Early music choirs
British vocal groups
Musical groups established in 1968